During 2011 and 2012, Bristol Rovers Football Club participated in League Two, the fourth level of English football. It was 129th season of football played by Bristol Rovers, and their 85th in the Football League. The previous saw Bristol Rovers end a four-year tenure in League One. Despite initial optimism of an instant return, the campaign proved disappointing as Rovers struggled for much of the season under new manager Paul Buckle before being replaced by Mark McGhee who brought about an upturn in fortunes to finish 13th.

The 2011–12 campaign saw Bristol Rovers play Burton Albion, Crawley Town and Morecambe for the first time, and featured a number of local matches against the likes of Cheltenham Town, Plymouth Argyle, Swindon Town, and Torquay United.

Season events

May
  – Bristol Rovers announce that 17 players will be released at the end of their contracts at the end of June. Striker Will Hoskins is transferred to Brighton & Hove Albion for an undisclosed fee.
  – Paul Buckle is appointed manager of Bristol Rovers, after leaving the manager position of Torquay United.

June
  – Bristol Rovers sign midfielder Matthew Gill and goalkeeper Scott Bevan.
  – Bristol Rovers sign midfielder Craig Stanley from Morecambe.
  – Bristol Rovers announce plans to move to a new 20,000 capacity stadium to be based on UWE's Frenchay campus
  – Bristol Rovers defender Danny Coles leaves transferred to westcountry rivals Exeter City.
  – Bristol Rovers sign defender Adam Virgo after he rejected a new contract at Yeovil Town.
  – Bristol Rovers sign Matt Harrold from Shrewsbury Town F.C. for an undisclosed fee. Former QPR defender Lee Brown signs on a two-year deal.
  – Bristol Rovers sign Mustapha Carayol for an undisclosed fee from Lincoln City.
  – Bristol Rovers sign 22-year-old defender Michael Smith from Ballymena United in Northern Ireland.
  – Bristol Rovers complete signing of 25-year-old goalkeeper Lance Cronin and striker Scott McGleish. Dominic Blizzard departs after having his contract terminated.
  – Harry Pell left the club after rejecting Bristol Rovers' offer of a new contract.

July
  – Chris Zebroski joins Bristol Rovers for an undisclosed fee from fellow South West outfit Torquay United.
  – Bristol Rovers sign former Bristol City and Charlton Athletic player Joe Anyinsah.
  – Bristol Rovers sign striker Kayne McLaggon and re-sign Leicester City defender Cian Bolger on a six-month loan deal.
  – Defender Michael Boateng joins Bristol Rovers on a one-year deal after impressing on trial.

August
  – Matt Gill is appointed captain of Bristol Rovers whilst Adam Virgo as vice captain.
  – Bristol Rovers begin the new season with a 3–2 win away to Football League new boys AFC Wimbledon live on Sky Sports. 11 players made their debuts with Byron Anthony the only non-debutant to start while Chris Lines and Jo Kuffour came off the bench.
  – The League Cup match against Watford was postponed after a police request. This came as a result of ongoing rioting in Bristol and across England.
  – Bristol Rovers sell Chris Lines to South Yorkshire team Sheffield Wednesday for a fee believed to be in the region of £50,000.
  – Torquay United, Paul Buckle's former club, beat Bristol Rovers 2–1 on the first home game of the season.
  – Bristol Rovers progress through to the League cup second round after a 4–2 penalties win over Championship side Watford.
  – Defender Danny Woodards joins Bristol Rovers signing a one-year deal.
  – League One side Leyton Orient knock Bristol Rovers out of the League Cup following a 3–2 win for the London side.
  – Ben Swallow joined Bath City on a three-month loan deal.

September
  – Bristol Rovers lose in the Johnstone's Paint Trophy first round to Wycombe Wanderers.
  – Charlie Clough joined Bath City on a month-long loan.
  – Bristol Rovers sign Oliver Norburn on a months loan from Leicester City.
  – Jo Kuffour is loaned to Gillingham for three months.

October
  – Bristol Rovers sign Wycombe striker Scott Rendell on loan for one month.
  – Charlie Clough had his loan at Bath City extended by another month.
  – Kayne McLaggon and Michael Boateng joined Tonbridge Angels on loan, while Charlie Reece joined Gloucester City also on loan.
  – Oliver Norburn's loan with Bristol Rovers was extended until the end of 2011.

November
  – Bristol Rovers sign central midfielder Andy Dorman on loan.
  – Bristol Rovers progress through to the second round of the FA Cup with a 3–1 win against Corby Town.
  – Charlie Clough had his Bath City extended for a third straight month.
  – Ben Swallow was recalled from his Bath City loan.

December
  – Bristol Rovers hammer AFC Totton 6–1 in the FA Cup second round match screened live on ITV.
  – Former captain and caretaker manager Stuart Campbell was released by Bristol Rovers. Michael Boateng joined Sutton United on loan for one month.

January
  – Goalkeeper Michael Poke and defender Aaron Downes joined Bristol Rovers on month long loan deals from Brighton & Hove Albion and Chesterfield respectively. Cian Bolger's loan was extended for another month.
  – Manager Paul Buckle was sacked as manager of Bristol Rovers with the club 19th in League Two. Buckle left the club having won just six league games out of 24 and winless since October in the league.
  – Bristol Rovers extend Andy Dorman's loan for another month.
  – Aston Villa beat Bristol Rovers 3–1 in the third round of the FA Cup in a match broadcast live on ESPN.
  – Jo Kuffour left Bristol Rovers on a permanent basis, joining Gillingham.
  – Bristol Rovers appointed Mark McGhee as the club's new manager on a two-and-a-half-year contract.
  – Aaron Downes, Andy Dorman and Cian Bolger all had their loans at Bristol Rovers extended until the end of the season. Goalkeeper Michael Poke has his loan extended by a further month.
  – Bristol Rovers signed Stoke City midfielder Matthew Lund on a monthlong loan. Charlie Reece joined Tamworth on loan for one month.
  – Bristol Rovers terminate Ben Swallow's contract. Jim Paterson joined Bristol Rovers until the end of the season.

February
  – Tom Parkes joined Bristol Rovers on a month's loan from Leicester City.
  – Byron Anthony joined Hereford United on loan for one month.
  – Bristol Rovers goalkeeper Lance Cronin rejoined his former club Ebbsfleet United on loan for a month.
  – Michael Poke's loan at Bristol Rovers was extended for a third and final month.
  – Bristol Rovers extend the loan of Matthew Lund from Stoke City until the end of April.

March
  – Striker Scott McGleish joined Barnet on loan for one month.
  – Planning permission for Bristol Rovers' new stadium, UWE Stadium, was submitted. Charlie Clough joined AFC Telford United on loan for one month.
  – Byron Anthony's loan at Hereford United was extended to the end of the season.
  – Ollie Clarke joined Clevedon Town on loan for the remainder of the season.

April
  – Scott McGleish's loan with Barnet was extended for the rest of the season.
  – Bristol Rovers hammer Burton Albion 7–1, the first time Rovers have scored 7 past anyone since 1973. It was also manager Mark McGhee's biggest victory of his managerial career so far.
  – Youngsters Eliot Richards and Ollie Clarke sign contracts extensions at Bristol Rovers of two years and one year respectively.

May
  – Conor Gough signed for Bristol Rovers on an emergency seven-day loan from Charlton Athletic. Rovers had already agreed to sign Gough permanently in the summer.
  – Bristol Rovers' season finished on a disappointing note, losing 4–0 to Dagenham & Redbridge. They finished 13th in the league table having picked up 57 points.

First team
As of 5 May 2012.

Squad statistics

Appearances, goals and cards

As of 5 May 2012.

Competitions

Overall

League Two

Standings

Results summary

Results by round

Scores Overview

Matches

League Two

August

September

October

November

December

January

February

March

April

May

FA Cup

Football League Cup

Football League Trophy

Pre-Season Friendlies

Transfers

In

Out

Awards

See also
2011–12 in English football
2011–12 Football League Two
List of Bristol Rovers F.C. seasons

References

External links
 Bristol Rovers F.C.
 Bristol Evening Post
 Soccerbase: ResultsStatsTransfers

Bristol Rovers F.C. seasons
Bristol Rovers